Sepp Mayerl, also known as Blasl-Sepp (14 April 1937 − 28 July 2012) was an Austrian mountaineer.

Mayerl was born on 14 April 1937 as the youngest of seven children into a farmer's family in the Tyrolean village of Göriach near Dölsach. He is renowned for making the first ascent of Lhotse Shar — a subsidiary summit of Lhotse — in May 1970 together with his friend Rolf Walter and for first climbing Mt. Jitchu Drake in May 1983 with Werner Sucher, Albert Egger, Alois Stuckler and Toni Ponholzer.

Mayerl fell to his death in the Lienzer Dolomites on 28 July 2012 while ascending the north ridge of the Adlerwand.  He was 75.

Further reading 

 Mayerl, Sepp (Rosenheim 1984): Der Turm in mir. Zu schwierigsten Gipfeln der Erde. Rosenheimer,  (with contributions by Reinhold Messner).
 Magerer, Hermann (2003): Bergauf Bergab 2. Bergverlag Rother, pp. 263−272

References 

1937 births
2012 deaths
People from Lienz District
Austrian mountain climbers
Sportspeople from Tyrol (state)